The Irish Gringo is a 1935 American western film directed by William C. Thompson and starring Pat Carlyle, William Farnum and Karlyn May.

Plot
The film is about a half-Mexican, half-Irish "gringo" who encounters a girl wandering the desert.  Her grandfather was killed by a gang of outlaws looking for a Dutch mine. The girl has a map of the mine drawn on her shirt, and the outlaws are looking to find it.

Cast
Pat Carlyle as Don O'Brien, The Irish Gringo
William Farnum as Pop Wiley
Karlyn May as Anita
Bryant Washburn as Malone
Elena Durán as Carlotta
Olin Francis as Rawlins - Henchman
Milburn Morante as Buffalo
Don Orlando as Pancho
Ace Cain as Ace Lewis
Rudolf Cornell as Jimmy Melton
Marjorie Medford as Sally Wiley
Fox O'Callahan as Henchman

Reception
The film has been described as "One of the more jaw-slackening excretions of the time".

References

External links

1935 films
1935 Western (genre) films
American black-and-white films